Batlagundu Subramanian Ramiah (24 March 1905 – 18 May 1983) was a Tamil writer, journalist, and critic from Tamil Nadu, India. He was also a script and dialogue writer in Tamil films.

Biography 

B. S. Ramiah was born in Batlagundu in 1905. He came to Madras in 1921. He was involved in the Indian independence movement and was jailed for his participation in the Salt Satyagraha. His first short story Malarum Manamum (lit. The flower and the scent) was published in Ananda Vikatan in 1933 (it won third prize in the magazine's short story competition). He worked in the literary magazine Manikodi and was a writer in the literary movement of the same name. He was a contemporary of Manikodi writers like C. S. Chellappa, Va. Ramasamy, Pudumaipithan and Ku. Pa. Rajagopalan. During 1935–38 and later briefly in the 1950s he ran the magazine himself. He has written a number of short stories, novels and plays. According to C. S. Chellappa Ramiah wrote 304 short stories in total. Most of his plays were written for S. V. Sahasranamam's "Seva Stage" drama troupe. His works have been published in Ananda Vikatan, Kalki, Kumudam, Dina Mani, Gandhi, Jeyakodi.

In 1982, he was awarded the Sahitya Akademi Award for Tamil for his literary history of the Manikodi movement – Manikodikalam (lit. The Manikodi Era). He also wrote a number of original screenplays for Tamil films and a few of his works were also made into films.

Partial bibliography

Non-fiction 

 Manikodikalam (literary history)
 Cinema...? (1943)

Plays 

 Therotti magan
 Policekaaran maga1
 President Panchatcharam (adaptation of Gogol's The Government Inspector)
 Malliyam Mangalam
 Poovilangu
 Panjali sabadham
 Kalappali

Novels 

 Vithiyin vilayattu komala
 Kailasa Iyerin kedumathi
 Premaharaam
 Nandha Vilakku
 Thinai vidaithavan
 Sandhaipettai

Filmography 

 Boologa Rambai (1940)
 Madanakamarajan (1941)
 Baktha Naradhar (1942)
 Kubera Kusela (1943)
 Paranjothi (1945)
 Saalivahan (1945)
 Arthanaari (1946)
 Visithira Vanidha(1947)
 Dhana Amaravathi (1947)
 Mahatma Udangkar (1947)
 Devadasi (1948)
 Rathan Kumar (1949)
 Maaya Rambai (1952)
 Amar (1954)
 President Panchatcharam (1959)
 Raja Magudam (1960)
Policekaran Magal (1962)
 Panathottam (1963)

References

Further reading 

 B. S. Ramaiyya by Palani Rahuladasan (Sahitya Akademi's India Ilakkiya Sirpigal Series)
 மணிக்கொடியை உயர்த்திய பி.எஸ்.ராமையா

1905 births
20th-century Indian journalists
Indian male screenwriters
Recipients of the Sahitya Akademi Award in Tamil
Tamil writers
1983 deaths
Journalists from Tamil Nadu
20th-century Indian novelists
20th-century Indian dramatists and playwrights
Novelists from Tamil Nadu
Indian Tamil people
Screenwriters from Tamil Nadu
20th-century Indian male writers
20th-century Indian screenwriters